Nazi-era German officials who resisted the Holocaust are individuals with official roles or membership in the German government, the Nazi Party, or the German Wehrmacht, between the years 1933–1945 during the rule of the Nazi Party, who resisted the Holocaust, either by working against the government, working to help Jews or other persecuted groups, or trying to reveal the nature of the Holocaust to others.

Government officials
 Georg Ferdinand Duckwitz (29 September 1904 – 16 February 1973) was a German diplomat. During World War II he served as an attaché for Nazi Germany in occupied Denmark. He tipped off the Danes about the Germans' intended deportation of the Jewish population in 1943 and arranged for their reception in Sweden. Danish resistance groups subsequently rescued 95% of Denmark's Jewish population. Israel has designated Duckwitz as one of the Righteous Among the Nations. After 1942, Duckwitz worked with the Nazi Reich representative Werner Best, who organized the Gestapo. On 11 September 1943 Best told Duckwitz about the intended round-up of all Danish Jews on 1 October. 
Duckwitz travelled to Berlin to attempt stopping the deportation through official channels.  That failed and he flew to Stockholm two weeks later, ostensibly to discuss the passage of German merchant ships. While there, he contacted Prime Minister Per Albin Hansson and asked whether Sweden would be willing to receive Danish Jewish refugees. In a couple of days, Hansson promised them a favourable reception. :Back in Denmark on 29 September, Duckwitz contacted Danish social democrat Hans Hedtoft and notified him of the intended deportation. Hedtoft warned the head of the Jewish community C.B. Henriques and the acting chief rabbi Marcus Melchior, who spread the warning. Sympathetic Danes in all walks of life organized a mass escape of over 7,200 Jews and 700 of their non-Jewish relatives by sea to Sweden. Duckwitz, apparently assuming that he had done everything he could and possibly fearing exposure to the Gestapo, went back to his official duties.

Nazi Party members

 Oskar Schindler - a controversial figure among some Holocaust survivors, Schindler joined the Nazi party and was at first a part of profiting from the confiscation of Jewish property by the Nazis. Later on, he used his connections and money to try and save Jews. He's estimated to have saved about 1200 with the help of his wife, Emilie Schindler.

Military personnel

Officers in the German Army
Wilm Hosenfeld (2 May 1895 – 13 August 1952), originally a school teacher, was a German Army officer who by the end of the Second World War had risen to the rank of Hauptmann (Captain). He helped to hide or rescue several Polish people, including Jews, in Nazi-German occupied Poland, and helped Jewish pianist and composer Władysław Szpilman to survive, hidden, in the ruins of Warsaw during the last months of 1944, an act which was portrayed in the 2002 film The Pianist. He was taken prisoner by the Red Army and died in Soviet captivity in 1952. In June 2009, Hosenfeld was posthumously recognized in Yad Vashem (Israel's official memorial to the victims of the Holocaust) as one of the Righteous Among the Nations.In 2002, The Pianist, a film based on Szpilman's memoirs of the same name, portrayed Hosenfeld's rescue of Władysław Szpilman. Hosenfeld was played by Thomas Kretschmann. In October 2007, Hosenfeld was posthumously honoured by the president of Poland Lech Kaczyński with a Commander’s Cross of the Order of Polonia Restituta.

See also
Yad Vashem
German resistance to Nazism
List of Germans who resisted Nazism
List of German Righteous Among the Nations

References

Nazi-era German officials who resisted the Holocaust

The Holocaust in Germany